William James Henderson (December 4, 1855 – June 5, 1937) was an American musical critic and scholar.

Biography
He was born on December 4, 1855 in Newark, New Jersey.

He graduated from Princeton in 1876 and immediately began work as a journalist, later as a reporter, then as the musical critic of The New York Times, and in 1902 of The New York Sun. He wrote perceptive press reviews of the performances of the Metropolitan Opera's star singers which remain valuable for today's scholars. Henderson's perspicacity as a musical reviewer and evaluator was recognised when he was appointed lecturer on musical history in the New York College of Music. He was also elected a member of the National Institute of Arts and Letters in 1914.

Three days after the death of his longtime friend and fellow newspaper music critic, Richard Aldrich, he committed suicide with a .38-calibre revolver in his West-Side Manhattan hotel room.  His New York Times obituary called him "for fifty years one of America's best known music critics."

Publications
 Sea Yarns for Boys
 Afloat with the Flag
 The Last Cruise of the Mohawk
 Preludes and Studies (1891)
 The Story of Music (1889; 12 enlarged ed., 1912)
 Elements of Navigation (1895)
 What is Good Music? (1898)
 How Music Developed (1899)
 The Orchestra and Orchestral Music (1902)
 Richard Wagner, His Life and His Dramas (1901)
 Modern musical Drift (1904)
 The Art of the singers (1906)
 Some Forerunners of Italian Opera (1911)
 The Soul of a Tenor (1912) a novel
 Early History of Singing (1921)

References

Baker, Theodore and Remy, Alfred, Ed. "Henderson, William James", Baker's Biographical Dictionary of Musicians, third edition, New York, 1919.
Slonimsky, Nicolas, Ed. Baker's Biographical Dictionary of Musicians, sixth edition, New York, 1978.
"Music: Silenced Oracles", Time, June 14, 1937.

External links
 
 
 

19th-century American novelists
20th-century American novelists
American male novelists
American male journalists
Critics employed by The New York Times
New York College of Music faculty
Opera critics
Princeton University alumni
Writers from Newark, New Jersey
1855 births
1937 suicides
American opera librettists
Suicides by firearm in New York City
19th-century American male writers
20th-century American male writers
Novelists from New Jersey
Novelists from New York (state)
20th-century American non-fiction writers